The Keşla 2017–18 season was Inter Baku's seventeenth Azerbaijan Premier League season.

Season events
On 28 October 2017, Inter Baku officially changed their name to Keşla FK. Following a 0–2 against Kapaz on 28 October, Keşla replaced Zaur Svanadze with Ramiz Mammadov the next day. On 25 December, Keşla announced that Ramie Mammadov had become the club's Sporting Director, with Yuriy Maksymov coming in as the club's new manager.

Squad

On loan

Transfers

Summer

In:

Out:

Winter

In:

Out:

Trial:

Friendlies

Competitions

Azerbaijan Premier League

Results summary

Results

League table

Azerbaijan Cup

Final

UEFA Europa League

Qualifying rounds

Squad statistics

Appearances and goals

|-
|colspan="14"|Players away on loan:

|-
|colspan="14"|Players who left Inter Baku during the season:

|}

Goal scorers

Disciplinary record

Notes

References

External links 
 Inter Baku at Soccerway.com

Shamakhi FK seasons
Azerbaijani football clubs 2017–18 season
Inter Baku